"Bad Seed" is a single by American country music artist Jan Howard. Released in September 1966, the song reached #10 on the Billboard Hot Country Singles chart. The single was later released on an album of the same name in 1966. The song was written by fellow country artist Bill Anderson.

In addition, "Bad Seed" became Howard's final top ten Billboard solo single of her career. The remainder of her top ten hits would come from collaborations with Bill Anderson.

Chart performance

References 

1966 singles
Jan Howard songs
Songs written by Bill Anderson (singer)
Song recordings produced by Owen Bradley
1966 songs
Decca Records singles